The 1990 British motorcycle Grand Prix was the eleventh round of the 1990 Grand Prix motorcycle racing season. It took place on the weekend of 3–5 August 1990 at Donington Park.

500 cc race report
Cagiva announces that after 10 years of participation it will withdraw from GP at the end of the season, citing cost overruns and lack of results. it is a false alarm, as they continue until 1994. Pierfrancesco Chili is replaced by Carl Fogarty.

Wayne Rainey gets a good start, but by the Craner Curves he is passed by Eddie Lawson, and is followed by Niall Mackenzie, Mick Doohan and Kevin Schwantz.

Rainey retakes the lead from Lawson, but Schwantz is now behind them. Wayne Gardner is out of the race with a mechanical and Fogarty crashes out.

Rainey still ahead, but Schwantz has moved into second ahead of Lawson at the chicane. Schwantz picks that same spot for his pass on Rainey, and is now in first. He opens up the gap and cruises to the win ahead of Rainey and Lawson.

500 cc classification

References

British motorcycle Grand Prix
British
Motorcycle Grand Prix